Nobody Left to Hate: Teaching Compassion after Columbine is a book by social psychologist Elliot Aronson that explores the implications of the attacks at Columbine.

Editions

References

Current affairs books
Works about the Columbine High School massacre
2001 non-fiction books